Segundo Mesías Navarrete Navarrete (born 21 May 1985) is an Ecuadorian racing cyclist, who rides for Ecuadorian amateur team Saitel. He rode at the 2014 UCI Road World Championships.

Major results
Source: 

2003
 9th Road race, Pan American Junior Road Championships
2004
 Pan American Under-23 Road Championships
6th Time trial
8th Road race
2007
 1st  Time trial, National Road Championships
 1st Stage 6 Vuelta al Ecuador
2008
 4th Overall Vuelta a Guatemala
 4th Overall Vuelta al Ecuador
2009
 1st  Time trial, National Road Championships
 2nd Overall Vuelta al Ecuador
 7th Overall Vuelta a Guatemala
2010
 1st  Time trial, National Road Championships
 8th Overall Vuelta a Bolivia
1st Stage 7
 9th Overall Vuelta al Ecuador
2011
 2nd Time trial, National Road Championships
 2nd Overall Vuelta a Bolivia
1st Stage 8a (ITT)
 6th Road race, Pan American Games
2012
 3rd Overall Vuelta al Ecuador
1st Prologue, Stage 3 (TTT) & 9
 9th Overall Vuelta a la Independencia Nacional
1st Stage 6
2013
 1st Stage 7 Vuelta a Guatemala
 2nd  Time trial, Bolivarian Games
 Pan American Road Championships
3rd  Road race
4th Time trial
2014
 National Road Championships
2nd Road race
3rd Time trial
 Pan American Road Championships
5th Time trial
6th Road race
2015
 National Road Championships
2nd Time trial
4th Road race
 Pan American Road Championships
7th Road race
7th Time trial
2016
 1st  Time trial, National Road Championships
2018
 National Road Championships
4th Road race
4th Time trial
2019
 National Road Championships
2nd Time trial
5th Road race
 3rd  Road race, Pan American Road Championships
2021
 National Road Championships
2nd Time trial
3rd Road race
 8th Overall Vuelta al Ecuador

References

External links

1985 births
Living people
Ecuadorian male cyclists
People from San Gabriel, Ecuador
Cyclists at the 2015 Pan American Games
Pan American Games competitors for Ecuador